Unified Socialist Party of Andalusia (in Spanish: Partido Socialista Unificado de Andalucía) was an independentist and communist party in Andalusia, Spain, emerging towards the end of the 1970s. PSUA later gave birth to the Liberation Front of Andalusia (FLA).

References

Andalusian nationalist parties
Defunct communist parties in Spain
Defunct nationalist parties in Spain
Left-wing nationalist parties
Political parties in Andalusia
Pro-independence parties
Secessionist organizations in Europe